Department of Printing and Publications is a government department responsible for printing government documents, stationery, and currency in Bangladesh and is located in Dhaka, Bangladesh.

History
Department of Printing and Publications was established on 30 August 1972. It is under the Ministry of Public Administration.

Notable agencies
 Bangladesh Government Press
 Government Printing Press
 Bangladesh Security Printing Press
 Bangladesh Forms and Publication Office
 Bangladesh Stationery Office

References

1972 establishments in Bangladesh
Mass media in Bangladesh
Organisations based in Dhaka
Government departments of Bangladesh
Printing